The Activision Decathlon is a sports game written by David Crane for the Atari 2600 and published by Activision in 1983. It was ported to the Atari 8-bit family, Atari 5200, Commodore 64, ColecoVision, and MSX.  Up to four players compete in the ten different events of a real-life decathlon, either in sequence or individually.

Gameplay

The events are:
100-Meter Dash
Long Jump
Shot Put
High Jump
400-Meter Race
110-Meter Hurdles
Discus Throw
Pole Vault
Javelin Throw
1500-Meter Race

Activision Decathlon Club patches
A player whose score met or exceeded the values below could send photo documentation to receive an Activision Decathlon Club patch in one of the colors of an Olympic medal:
8,600 points: Bronze
9,000 points: Silver
10,000 points: Gold

Reception
Shortly after release, Activision's Decathlon drew comparisons to Konami's popular arcade game Hyper Olympic (Track & Field), which was introduced at the Amusement Machine Show a month later in September 1983. According to Cash Box magazine, several people claimed there were "cursory similarities" between the two games.

The Atari 2600 version of Decathlon was reviewed by Video magazine in its "Arcade Alley" column where it was described as "an absolute triumph of imaginative programming" and as "a masterwork." Computer and Video Games rated the VCS version 92% while giving the ColecoVision version a 93% score.

In 1985, the game appeared at number-two on the Atari 8-bit chart in the United Kingdom.

Legacy
The game was later reissued simply as Decathlon by the UK budget label Firebird. It was included in the 2002 PlayStation 2 compilation Activision Anthology.

See also

List of Atari 2600 games
List of Activision games: 1980–1999
Olympic Decathlon, 1980 computer game with similar concept and controls

References

External links
The Activision Decathlon for Atari 2600 at Atari Mania

The Activision Decathlon video capture

1983 video games
Activision games
Atari 2600 games
Atari 5200 games
Atari 8-bit family games
ColecoVision games
Commodore 64 games
MSX games
Olympic video games
Athletics video games
Multiple-stage competition video games
Video games developed in the United States